Waifs and Strays is a short story collection by O. Henry, released posthumously in 1917.  It was published by Doubleday, Page & Company.

Contents
 "The Red Roses of Tonia"
 "Round The Circle"
 "The Rubber Plant's Story"
 "Out of Nazareth"
 "Confessions of a Humorist"
 "The Sparrows in Madison Square"
 "Hearts and Hands"
 "The Cactus"
 "The Detective Detector"
 "The Dog and the Playlet"
 "A Little Talk About Mobs"
 "The Snow Man"

References

1917 short story collections
English-language books
Books published posthumously
Short story collections by O. Henry